The Hollow is the second studio album by American metalcore band Memphis May Fire. It was released on April 26, 2011, through Rise Records. The album is the band's first release on the label.

It is the first album to feature Jake Garland on drums, replacing former drummer Eric Molesworth and the last to have rhythm guitarist Ryan Bentley before his departure in April 2011, to be replaced by Anthony Sepe.

Track listing
All lyrics written by Matty Mullins, all music composed by Kellen McGregor and Memphis May Fire

Personnel
Memphis May Fire
 Matty Mullins – lead vocals, keyboards
 Kellen McGregor – lead guitar
 Ryan Bentley – rhythm guitar
 Cory Elder – bass
 Jake Garland – drums
Production
 Produced, mixed and mastered by Cameron Mizell
 Engineered by Ryan Bentley and Kellen McGregor
 Composed by Kellen McGregor and Matty Mullins
 Artwork by Glenn Thomas (We Are Synapse)
 Photo by Sam Link

References

2011 albums
Memphis May Fire albums
Rise Records albums